Jack Wayne Sikma (born November 14, 1955) is an American former professional basketball center. He was a seven-time NBA All-Star with the Seattle SuperSonics, who drafted him in the first round with the eighth overall pick of the 1977 NBA draft. In 1979, he won an NBA championship with Seattle. Sikma finished his playing career with the Milwaukee Bucks. He was elected to the Naismith Basketball Hall of Fame in 2019.

He was known for his trademark reverse pivot and step back behind-the-head jumper, coined as the "Sikma move", along with his distinctive blond hair during his playing days, which he wore in a pageboy early in his career and in a curly style later on. During his thirteen-year career, he reached the playoffs eleven times and anomalously established himself as an accurate-shooting center. His style of play would become significantly influential for centers at both the amateur and professional levels. Sikma scored 17,287 points in his NBA career.

Early life
Sikma was born in Kankakee, Illinois to Grace and Clarence Sikma and attended St. Anne High School in St. Anne, Illinois. He lived in rural Wichert, Illinois growing up. Sikma was a guard his first three years of high school, before a growth spurt had him at 6'10" going into his senior season. Nicknamed "the Wichert Wonder," Sikma led the St. Anne High School Cardinals to a fourth-place finish in the 1974 Illinois High School Association (IHSA) Class A boys basketball tournament, scoring 100 points in his four tournament games.

Collegiate career
Sikma played collegiately at Illinois Wesleyan University in Bloomington, Illinois, graduating in 1977 and majoring in accounting. After being heavily recruited by many Division I schools, Sikma was swayed by his close relationship with Illinois Wesleyan coach Dennie Bridges and being able to immediately play as a freshman. At the time, the NAIA allowed this, but the NCAA did not.  Sikma also liked that Illinois Wesleyan had several Division I schools on their schedule.

At Illinois Wesleyan, Sikma was a three-time National Association of Intercollegiate Athletics (NAIA) All-American and averaged 27.0 points and 15.4 rebounds as a senior. Sikma was chosen as the College Conference of Illinois and Wisconsin (CCIW) Most Outstanding Player for three straight years. He was later inducted into the NAIA Hall of Fame (2012), the Small Schools Basketball Hall of Fame (2017) and was a member of the NAIA 50th & 75th All-Anniversary Teams. He was also a two-time Academic All-American and was selected to the CoSIDA Academic All-American Hall of Fame (1999).

At Wesleyan, Sikma remains the school's all-time leading scorer and rebounder averaging 21.2 points (2,272 career points) and 13.1 rebounds (1,405 career rebounds). In each of his last three seasons, the Titans won College Conference of Illinois and Wisconsin Conference Championships and advanced to the National Association of Intercollegiate Athletics Tournament.

NBA career

Seattle Supersonics (1977-1986)

Sikma was a first round pick, drafted with the eighth overall selection in the 1977 NBA draft by the Seattle SuperSonics. Due to the relatively small size of his alma mater, Sikma was considered an unknown quantity compared to the "established, well‐publicized stars" taken before him.

As a rookie in 1977-1978, Sikma averaged 10.7 points and 8.3 rebounds, and on March 24, 1978, scored a rookie season high 28 points, along with recording 10 rebounds and 5 assists, in a 104-102 win over the Indiana Pacers. The Sonics made it to 1978 NBA Finals, losing to the Washington Bullets in seven games. Sikma was named to the NBA All-Rookie Team at the end of the season.

The next season, 1978-1979, Sikma averaged 15.6 points and 12.4 rebounds and became an All-Star. With Sikma averaging a double-double of 14.8 points and 11.7 rebounds in the playoffs, including scoring a game high 33 points along with grabbing 11 rebounds to lead Seattle to a Game 7 Western Conference Finals win over the Phoenix Suns. Sikma,  head coach Lenny Wilkens and teammates Dennis Johnson, Gus Williams, Fred Brown, John Johnson and Paul Silas, went on to defeat the Washington Bullets in an NBA Finals rematch. Sikma's final free throws were the last points scored by the Sonics to win the series.

In 1984, Sikma signed a five-year contract with the Supersonics. Sonics General Manager Les Habegger remarked, "After careful consideration, we concluded that we could look far and wide and never obtain another center of his caliber." In that season's all-star game, Sikma recorded his highest all-star game totals of points and rebounds, with 15 and 12 respectively. Sikma continued his All-Star caliber play, but was forced to undergo finger surgery in 1985. 

With the Supersonics, Sikma was selected to seven consecutive All-Star Games, from 1979 to 1985. In nine seasons and 715 games with Seattle, Sikma averaged a double-double of 16.8 points, 10.8 rebounds, along with 3.3 assists, 1.1 steals and 1.0 blocks, shooting 47% from the field and 83% from the line.

Milwaukee Bucks (1986-1991)

After missing the playoffs for two years, Sikma requested a trade from Seattle. In 1986, Sikma and Seattle's 1988 second-round draft pick were traded to the Milwaukee Bucks in exchange for Alton Lister and Milwaukee's first-round draft picks in 1987 and 1989. Later in response, Sports Illustrated would report:

Milwaukee Coach Don Nelson felt Sikma was the missing piece of a team that had frequently dominated the regular season before being exposed at the center position in the playoffs. Milwaukee struggled with injuries leading to the playoffs.

In the initial playoff series, Sikma scored 11 points in the fourth quarter to get past Charles Barkley and the Philadelphia 76ers. In the next series, the Bucks were defeated by the Boston Celtics in a seven-game series, during which Sikma averaged 17.6 points and 9.6 rebounds per game. In the series, Sikma was one of eight players fined for fighting or leaving the bench to join the brawl.

During the following pre-season, Sikma and the Bucks participated in the diplomatically oriented Basketball Open, a round-robin, exhibition tournament, which included a match with the U.S.S.R. national team and the Italian national team (a country where Sikma was particularly popular). On December 11, 1987, Sikma scored what would be his highest point total while on the Bucks, with 35 points alongside 7 rebounds during a 125-117 win over the Portland Trail Blazers.

With the Bucks, Sikma showed his superb shooting skills and made the playoffs every year for the remainder of his career. Despite being the team's center, Sikma was one of the most effective free-throw shooters in the league and he would shoot technical free throws for the team, Sikma set a then-record of 51 games without a free throw miss. His late-career three point shooting was cited as a sign of league-wide adoption.

In 1989, he would face his former team in what was then the longest game in the shot clock era at four hours and 17 minutes, scoring 23 points and grabbing 8 rebounds, while winning by a score of 155-154 in the fifth overtime.

Into his final season, Sikma remained an effective big man, playing 77 regular season games and three playoff games, including twice grabbing 14 rebounds in a game.

In five seasons and 392 games with Milwaukee, Sikma averaged 13.4 points, 7.9 rebounds and 2.9 assists, shooting 45% from the floor and 88% from the line.

Overall career

Sikma averaged a double-double in points and rebounds in eight seasons, always averaged double points-per-game figures throughout his career, and after his stint with the Sonics, he maintained consistent numbers while playing with the Milwaukee Bucks in his final five seasons. For his career, Sikma averaged 15.6 points (17,287 in total) and 9.8 rebounds (10,816) over 14 seasons and 1107 games.

Sikma was one of the most accurate shooting centers in NBA history. He holds the rare distinction of leading the league in free-throw percentage (92.2%) while playing the center position during the 1987–88 season; he averaged 84.9% in free-throw shooting for his career. Sikma also made over 200 three-pointers during his career with a 32.8% three-point accuracy.

Along with his accurate shooting, Sikma led the league in defensive rebounds in both 1981–82 and 1983–84.

Coaching career
From 2003 to 2007, Sikma was a Seattle SuperSonics assistant coach.

In June 2007 Sikma was hired by the Houston Rockets as an assistant coach under Coach Rick Adelman. Among his duties was tutoring center Yao Ming in "big man" playing strategies.

On December 6, 2011, he was signed as an assistant coach by the Minnesota Timberwolves, again under Adelman.

Beginning in 2017, Sikma acted as a coaching consultant for the Toronto Raptors, particularly working with center Jonas Valančiūnas.

Legacy

Sikma was a pioneer as one of the earliest sharp-shooting big men, a role that would become common after the turn of the 21st century. As a center, Sikma's distinct shot and uncharacteristic accuracy allowed him to play a role outside of the paint. His signature Sikma-1/Sikma-2 moves were key to future agile centers with agility and shooting touch. Instructional coach Pete Newell wrote on Sikma's signature move in his 2008 book, Playing Big as "baseline moves for loose defenses. Towards the end of his career where his lack of athleticism prevented Sikma from using his eponymous move and no other big men appeared to be able to replicate it, he stated that coaches were inquiring him about the technique, even though he believed it would be defunct upon his retirement.

Sikma's overall strength and height, combined with his shooting ability and rebounding become a more common prototype long after his retirement, with protegees like Yao Ming and Kevin Love becoming quality players in the NBA. On a January 2019 NBA TV segment, former players Chris Webber, Isiah Thomas, and Kevin McHale discussed his unexpected influence on modern-day basketball play with a segment entitled, "Jack Sikma's moves still being used today", discussing common moves taller players have since adopted to utilize their shooting and passing abilities. The "stretch 5" has since become common in the NBA, with the number of three pointers made by centers sharply increasing. His Sikma moves remains widely taught in amateur basketball, including being one of College Basketball Hall of Fame coach Bo Ryan's five required skills for his team's big men, being cited by local, girls' basketball coaches in 2019, and being strongly touted by college players born well after Sikma's retirement.

Personal life 
Sikma lived in Medina, Washington. A long-time Seattle-area resident, Sikma sold his mansion to Bill Gates in 1997 as a temporary residence while Gates's own mansion was being built.

Sikma married Shawn Strickland, a model, in 1984.  Their son, Luke, played for the University of Portland Pilots, and plays professionally in Germany. A younger son, Nate, played for the University of Hartford Hawks men's basketball team.

American speed skater Bonnie Blair cited Sikma as an early sponsor before she won her Olympic medals.

Honors

 Sikma was selected to the College Sports Information Directors of America (CoSIDA) Academic All-American Hall of Fame in 1998.
 In 2006, Sikma was voted as one of the 100 Legends of the IHSA Boys Basketball Tournament, a group of former players and coaches in honor of the 100 anniversary of the Illinois High School Boys Basketball Championship.
 In 2012, Sikma was inducted into the National Association of Intercollegiate Athletics Hall of Fame.
 On June 27, 2017, Sikma was inducted into the Small College Basketball Hall of Fame. Inducted alongside Sikma were Zelmo Beaty, Walt Frazier, Bob Love, Elmore Smith, Jim Spivey, Rico Swanson, George Tinsley, and Al Tucker.
 Sikma's no. 43 jersey was retired by the Seattle SuperSonics, one of only six players to be honored by the team.
 Sikma was member of the Division III 50th & 75th All-Anniversary Teams.
 Sikma was elected to the Naismith Basketball Hall of Fame in 2019.

NBA career statistics

Regular season 

|-
| style="text-align:left;"| 
| style="text-align:left;"|Seattle
| 82 || – || 27.3 || .455 || – || .777 || 8.3 || 1.6 || 0.8 || 0.5 || 10.7
|-
| style="text-align:left;background:#afe6ba;"|†
| style="text-align:left;"|Seattle
| 82 || – || 36.1 || .460 || – || .814 || 12.4 || 3.2 || 1.0 || 0.8 || 15.6
|-
| style="text-align:left;"| 
| style="text-align:left;"|Seattle
| 82 || – || 34.1 || .475 || .000 || .805 || 11.1 || 3.4 || 0.8 || 0.9 || 14.3
|-
| style="text-align:left;"| 
| style="text-align:left;"|Seattle
| 82 || – || 35.6 || .454 || .000 || .823 || 10.4 || 3.0 || 1.0 || 1.1 || 18.7
|-
| style="text-align:left;"| 
| style="text-align:left;"|Seattle
| 82 || 82 || 37.2 || .479 || .154 || .855 || 12.7 || 3.4 || 1.2 || 1.3 || 19.6
|-
| style="text-align:left;"| 
| style="text-align:left;"|Seattle
| 75 || 71 || 34.2 || .464 || .000 || .837 || 11.4 || 3.1 || 1.2 || 0.9 || 18.2
|-
| style="text-align:left;"| 
| style="text-align:left;"|Seattle
| 82 || 82 || 36.5 || .499 || .000 || .856 || 11.1 || 4.0 || 1.2 || 1.1 || 19.1
|-
| style="text-align:left;"| 
| style="text-align:left;"|Seattle
| 68 || 68 || 35.3 || .489 || .200 || .852 || 10.6 || 4.2 || 1.2 || 1.3 || 18.5
|-
| style="text-align:left;"| 
| style="text-align:left;"|Seattle
| 80 || 78 || 34.9 || .462 || .000 || .864 || 9.4 || 3.8 || 1.2 || 0.9 || 17.1
|-
| style="text-align:left;"| 
| style="text-align:left;"|Milwaukee
| 82 || 82 || 30.9 || .463 || .000 || .847 || 10.0 || 2.5 || 1.1 || 1.1 || 12.7
|-
| style="text-align:left;"| 
| style="text-align:left;"|Milwaukee
| 82 || 82 || 35.6 || .486 || .214 ||style="background:#cfecec;"| .922* || 8.6 || 3.4 || 1.1 || 1.0 || 16.5
|-
| style="text-align:left;"| 
| style="text-align:left;"|Milwaukee
| 80 || 80 || 32.3 || .431 || .380 || .905 || 7.8 || 3.6 || 1.1 || 0.8 || 13.4
|-
| style="text-align:left;"| 
| style="text-align:left;"|Milwaukee
| 71 || 70 || 31.7 || .416 || .342 || .885 || 6.9 || 3.2 || 1.1 || 0.7 || 13.9
|-
| style="text-align:left;"| 
| style="text-align:left;"|Milwaukee
| 77 || 44 || 25.2 || .427 || .341 || .843 || 5.7 || 1.9 || 0.8 || 0.8 || 10.4
|- class="sortbottom"
| style="text-align:center;" colspan="2"| Career
| 1,107 || 739 || 33.4 || .464 || .328 || .849 || 9.8 || 3.2 || 1.0 || 0.9 || 15.6
|- class="sortbottom"
| style="text-align:center;" colspan="2"| All-Star
| 7 || 0 || 21.0 || .471 || .000 || .875 || 6.0 || 1.6 || 1.3 || 1.0 || 7

Playoffs 

|-
|style="text-align:left;"|1978
|style="text-align:left;"|Seattle
|22||–||31.9||.466||–||.780||8.1||1.2||0.8||0.5||13.7
|-
|style="text-align:left;background:#afe6ba;"|1979†
|style="text-align:left;"|Seattle
|17||–||38.5||.455||–||.787||11.7||2.5||0.9||1.4||14.8
|-
|style="text-align:left;"|1980
|style="text-align:left;"|Seattle
|15||–||35.6||.399||.000||.852||8.4||3.7||1.1||0.3||11.7
|-
|style="text-align:left;"|1982
|style="text-align:left;"|Seattle
|8||–||39.4||.445||–||.862||12.1||3.0||1.1||1.0||20.5
|-
|style="text-align:left;"|1983
|style="text-align:left;"|Seattle
|2||–||37.5||.355||.000||.667||13.0||5.5||1.0||1.0||15.0
|-
|style="text-align:left;"|1984
|style="text-align:left;"|Seattle
|5||–||38.6||.500||.000||.857||10.2||1.0||0.6||1.4||22.0
|-
|style="text-align:left;"|1987
|style="text-align:left;"|Milwaukee
|12||12||35.5||.487||.000||.980||10.8||1.9||1.3||0.8||16.2
|-
|style="text-align:left;"|1988
|style="text-align:left;"|Milwaukee
|5||5||38.0||.461||.000||.833||12.4||2.6||0.4||0.8||19.0
|-
|style="text-align:left;"|1989
|style="text-align:left;"|Milwaukee
|9||9||33.4||.394||.286||.821||5.6||3.3||0.9||0.4||11.7
|-
|style="text-align:left;"|1990
|style="text-align:left;"|Milwaukee
|4||4||29.3||.261||.286||.750||3.5||1.8||0.5||1.0||5.0
|-
|style="text-align:left;"|1991
|style="text-align:left;"|Milwaukee
|3||0||17.0||.400||.500||.500||4.0||2.0||1.7||0.3||4.7
|- class="sortbottom"
| style="text-align:center;" colspan="2"| Career
| 102 || 30 || 34.9 || .445 || .244 || .830 || 9.3 || 2.4 || 1.0 || 0.8 || 14.3

See also

List of National Basketball Association career rebounding leaders
List of National Basketball Association career turnovers leaders
List of National Basketball Association players with most steals in a game

References

External links

Coach profile @ nba.com

1955 births
Living people
American men's basketball coaches
American men's basketball players
American people of Dutch descent
Basketball coaches from Illinois
Basketball players from Illinois
Centers (basketball)
Houston Rockets assistant coaches
Illinois Wesleyan Titans men's basketball players
Milwaukee Bucks players
Minnesota Timberwolves assistant coaches
Naismith Memorial Basketball Hall of Fame inductees
National Basketball Association All-Stars
National Basketball Association players with retired numbers
People from Medina, Washington
Power forwards (basketball)
Seattle SuperSonics assistant coaches
Seattle SuperSonics draft picks
Seattle SuperSonics players
Sportspeople from Kankakee, Illinois